Viktorio Pavlov (born 28 May 1973) is a former Bulgarian footballer who most recently managed Neftochimic.

Playing career
For the majority of his career Pavlov played in the top division of Bulgarian football, most notably for Bulgarian powerhouses CSKA Sofia and Levski Sofia, while also having short spells in Spain and Greece. Between 1996 and 1998, Pavlov earned 3 caps for Bulgaria.

Coaching career
Following his retirement, he has mainly worked as an assistant and youth team coach with Levski Sofia and also managed Lokomotiv Mezdra, Botev Vratsa, and the Bulgaria U17 national side. Between late June and early October 2020,  Pavlov was head coach of Neftochimic.

In July 2021, Pavlov was appointed manager of Vitosha Bistritsa's U19's.

References

External links
 
 Profile at LevskiSofia.info

1973 births
Living people
Bulgarian footballers
Bulgaria international footballers
PFC CSKA Sofia players
FC Lokomotiv 1929 Sofia players
PFC Levski Sofia players
PFC Slavia Sofia players
First Professional Football League (Bulgaria) players
Bulgarian expatriate footballers
Expatriate footballers in Spain
Bulgarian expatriate sportspeople in Spain
Expatriate footballers in Greece
Bulgarian expatriate sportspeople in Greece
Association football midfielders
Footballers from Sofia